An F-type main-sequence star (F V) is a main-sequence, hydrogen-fusing star of spectral type F and luminosity class V. These stars have from 1.0 to 1.4 times the mass of the Sun and surface temperatures between 6,000 and 7,600 K.Tables VII and VIII. This temperature range gives the F-type stars a whitish hue when observed by the atmosphere. Because a main-sequence star is referred to as a dwarf star, this class of star may also be termed a yellow-white dwarf (not to be confused with white dwarfs, remnant stars that are a possible final stage of stellar evolution). Notable examples include Procyon A, Gamma Virginis A and B, and KIC 8462852.

Spectral standard stars

The revised Yerkes Atlas system (Johnson & Morgan 1953) listed a dense grid of F-type dwarf spectral standard stars; however, not all of these have survived to this day as stable standards.
The anchor points of the MK spectral classification system among the F-type main-sequence dwarf stars, i.e. those standard stars that have remained unchanged over years and can be used to define the system, are considered to be 78 Ursae Majoris (F2 V) and pi3 Orionis (F6 V). In addition to those two standards, Morgan & Keenan (1973) considered the following stars to be dagger standards: HR 1279 (F3 V), HD 27524 (F5 V), HD 27808 (F8 V), HD 27383 (F9 V), and Beta Virginis (F9 V). 
Other primary MK standard stars include HD 23585 (F0 V), HD 26015 (F3 V), and HD 27534 (F5 V). Note that two Hyades members with almost identical HD names (HD 27524 and HD 27534) are both considered strong F5 V standard stars, and indeed they share nearly identical colors and magnitudes.
Gray & Garrison (1989)</ref> provide a modern table of dwarf standards for the hotter F-type stars. F1 and F7 dwarf standards stars are rarely listed, but have changed slightly over the years among expert classifiers. Often-used standard stars in this class include 37 Ursae Majoris (F1 V) and Iota Piscium (F7 V). No F4 V standard stars currently have been officially published yet. 
Unfortunately F9 V defines the boundary between the hot stars classified by Morgan, and the cooler stars classified by Keenan a step lower, and there are discrepancies in the literature on which stars define the F/G dwarf boundary. Morgan & Keenan (1973) listed Beta Virginis and HD 27383 as F9 V standards, but Keenan & McNeil (1989) listed HD 10647 as their F9 V standard instead. Eta Cassiopeiae A should probably be avoided as a standard star, but maybe as a boundary star, because it was often considered F9 V in Keenan's publications, but G0 V in Morgan's publications.

Life cycle
F-type stars have a life-cycle similar to G-type stars. They are hydrogen-fusing and will eventually grow into a red giant that fuses helium instead of hydrogen once their supply of hydrogen is depleted. After the helium too runs out, they begin to fuse carbon. When that also runs out, they shed their outer layers, creating a planetary nebula, and leaving behind, at the center of the nebula, a hot white dwarf. These stars remain stable for ~2-4 billion years. In comparison, G-type stars, like the Sun, stay stable for ~10 billion years.

Planets
Some of the nearest F-type stars known to support planets include Upsilon Andromedae, Tau Boötis, HD 10647, HD 33564, HD 142, HD 60532, and KOI-3010.

Habitability
Some studies show that there is a possibility that life could also develop on planets that orbit an F-type star. It is estimated that the habitable zone of a relatively hot F0 star would extend from about 2.0 AU to 3.7 AU and between 1.1 and 2.2 AU for a relatively cool F8 star. However, relative to a G-type star the main problems for a hypothetical lifeform in this particular scenario would be the more intense light and the shorter stellar lifespan of the home star.

F-type stars are known to emit much higher energy forms of light, such as UV radiation, which in the long term can have a profoundly negative effect on DNA molecules. Studies have shown that, for a hypothetical planet positioned at an equivalent habitable distance from an F-type star as the Earth is from the Sun (this is farther away from the F-type star, inside the habitable zone of a G2-type), and with a similar atmosphere, life on its surface would receive about 2.5 to 7.1 times more damage from UV light compared to that on Earth. Thus, for its native lifeforms to survive, the hypothetical planet would need to have sufficient atmospheric shielding, such as a denser ozone layer in the upper atmosphere. Without a robust ozone layer, life could theoretically develop on the planet's surface, but it would most likely be confined to underwater or underground regions or has somehow adapted external covering against (e.g. shells).

References

 
Star types